The Ohiya rat (Srilankamys ohiensis), or Sri Lanka bi-colored rat, is a species of rodent in the family Muridae.
It is the only species in the genus Srilankamys.  It is found only in Sri Lanka where it is known locally as ශ්‍රී ලංකා දෙපැහැ මීයා in Sinhala.

Description
Head and body length is 15–18 cm. Tail is 19–21 cm. Steel gray above grading to pale yellowish gray on the sides. Underparts pure white. Tail distinctive. Dusky purple above, white below, the tip white all round. Head relatively large. Large ears pink inside. Eyes small, almond-shaped. Pinkish muzzle. Light-colored feet.

References

 de A. Goonatilake, W.I.L.D.P.T.S., Nameer, P.O. & Molur, S. 2008.  .   2009 IUCN Red List of Threatened Species.   Downloaded on 6 October 2009.

Old World rats and mice
Endemic fauna of Sri Lanka
Rodents of Sri Lanka
Mammals described in 1929
Taxonomy articles created by Polbot